Sacred Fire is a fantasy novel by Chris Pierson, set in the world of Dragonlance, and based on the Dungeons & Dragons role-playing game. It is the third novel in the "Kingpriest" series. It was published in paperback in December 2003.

Plot summary
Sacred Fire explores part of the history of the world of Krynn.

Reception

References

2003 novels
Dragonlance novels